Robert Osborne Shearman (14 September 1939 – 27 June 1999) was an Australian rules footballer who played for the Essendon Football Club in the Victorian Football League (VFL) and for the West Torrens Football Club and Sturt Football Club in the South Australian National Football League (SANFL).

Born in Melbourne, Shearman was recruited from Aberfeldie in the Essendon District League, and made his debut at 16 years of age. He became renowned as a strong half-back flanker who could take high marks, kick prodigious drop kicks, and was good at ground level.

In 1961 at the age of 21, Shearman moved to South Australia and joined West Torrens. He represented South Australia at the 1961 carnival, winning All Australian selection and captained West Torrens in 1963 and 1964. In 1965 he stood out of football for the season awaiting a clearance to Sturt.  Joining Sturt in 1966, he was a key part of that club's "Golden Era", playing in consecutive premierships from 1966 to 1970.  Shearman was subsequently named a member of Sturt's "Team of the century".

Shearman was a prodigious kicker of the ball and twice won the Craven Filter national champion kick of Australia.

Shearman died suddenly on 27 June 1999.

Since 2000, Sturt and Woodville West Torrens have competed for the RO Shearman Testimonial Trophy.

References

Bibliography

External links

Essendon Football Club players
West Torrens Football Club players
Sturt Football Club players
Aberfeldie Football Club players
All-Australians (1953–1988)
Australian rules footballers from Melbourne
South Australian Football Hall of Fame inductees
1939 births
1999 deaths